CSK may refer to:

Companies
 CSK Auto, subsidiary of O'Reilly Auto Parts
 CSK Holdings Corporation, Japanese IT company

Schools
 Carmel School, Kuwait, Catholic school in Kuwait
 Chan Sui Ki (La Salle) College, Anglo-Chinese boys' high school in Hong Kong

Sports
 CSK VVS Samara (ice hockey), a professional ice hockey team in Samara, Samara Oblast, Russia
 Charlottenlund SK, Norwegian sports club
 Chennai Super Kings, an Indian IPL franchise

Other
 C-src tyrosine kinase, an enzyme
 Color shift keying
 ICAO airline designator for Flightcraft in the United States
 Claremont serial killer; see Claremont serial killings
 Commander of the Order of the Star and Key of the Indian Ocean
 Country code of the former country of Czechoslovakia
 CSK, National Rail station code for Calstock railway station, Cornwall, England
 ISO-4217 currency code of its currency, the Czechoslovak koruna